Bohumilice is a municipality and village in Prachatice District in the South Bohemian Region of the Czech Republic. It has about 300 inhabitants.

Notable people
Antonín Liška (1924–2003), bishop of České Budějovice

References

Villages in Prachatice District
Bohemian Forest